The 2002 UEFA Super Cup was played on 30 August 2002 between Real Madrid of Spain and Feyenoord of the Netherlands. Real Madrid qualified by beating Bayer Leverkusen in the 2002 UEFA Champions League Final. Feyenoord had made it to the Super Cup after beating Borussia Dortmund in the 2002 UEFA Cup Final. Real Madrid won the match 3–1, securing their first Super Cup win.

Venue
The Stade Louis II in Monaco has been the venue for the UEFA Super Cup every year since 1998. Built in 1985, the stadium is also the home of AS Monaco, who play in the French league system.

Sponsorship
 Carlsberg
 Intersport
 MasterCard/EuroCard

Teams

Match

Details

See also
2001–02 UEFA Champions League
2001–02 UEFA Cup
Real Madrid CF in international football competitions

References

Super Cup
Uefa Super Cup 2002
Uefa super
2002
Supercup
2002 in Monégasque sport
International club association football competitions hosted by Monaco
August 2002 sports events in Europe